Nikolay Mikhaylovich Matorin (1898–1936) was a Russian ethnographer and  folklorist. He lectured at the Geographic Institute in Leningrad from 1924, becoming an associate professor in the Ethnographic Department there in 1928 and professor in 1930. He specialised in religious studies and by 1930 he was appointed deputy chairman of the Committee for the Study of Ethnic Composition of USSR. After three years as director of the Peter the Great Museum of Anthropology and Ethnography (MAE) he became director of the Institute of Anthropology and Ethnography when MAE was merged with the Institute for the Study of the Narodnosti of the USSR in 1933. While director of the MAE, he was among the founders of the Museum of the History of Religion.

He resisted the politicisation of Soviet sciences by Nikolai Marr. He was finally arrested during the Great Purge in 1935 and executed by shooting in 1936.

References

1898 births
1936 deaths
Russian folklorists
Russian ethnographers
Great Purge victims
Etnograficheskoe Obozrenie editors